Hard Scrabble (Addison Hollow) and Snow Town were two African American neighborhoods located in Providence, Rhode Island in the nineteenth century. They were also the sites of race riots in which working-class whites destroyed multiple black homes in 1824 and 1831, respectively.

Hard Scrabble
Hard Scrabble was a predominantly black neighborhood in northwestern Providence in the early 19th century. Away from the town center, its inexpensive rents attracted working class free blacks, poor people of all races and marginalized businesses such as saloons and houses of prostitution. Tensions developed between the residents of Hard Scrabble and other residents of Providence. Hard Scrabble was one of several similar neighborhoods in urban centers in the Northeast where free blacks gathered to further themselves socially and economically. Other African American communities created in cities with growing job markets in the same time period include the northern slope of Boston’s Beacon Hill, Little Liberia in Bridgeport, Connecticut and Sandy Ground on New York’s Staten Island.

On October 18, 1824, a white mob attacked black homes in Hard Scrabble, after a black man refused to get off the sidewalk when approached by some whites. Although the mob claimed to be targeting places of ill-repute, it destroyed buildings indiscriminately. Hundreds of whites destroyed approximately 20 black homes. Four people were tried for rioting, but only one was found guilty.

Snow Town
After the Hard Scrabble riot, the Snow Town neighborhood rose in roughly the same area. It was another interracial neighborhood where free blacks and poor whites lived among crime and marginal businesses. In 1831 more riots took place in Snow Town, one triggered by the shooting death of a sailor. Once again, the mob destroyed many homes, targeting black homes even though the people living in them had no apparent ties to the shooting, spilling over into nearby Olney Street. This time, the militia was called out, and it killed four white rioters.

Political fallout
The Hardscrabble Riot had engendered little media sympathy for its victims. But by the time of the Snow Town riot, leading citizens and journalists took the problem far more seriously. After the Snow Town riot, written opinion approved of suppressing rioters to maintain order, and Providence voters approved a charter for a city government containing strong police powers.

Location and memorialization

The exact location of the Hard Scrabble and Snow Town neighborhoods within northwestern Providence has been a matter of some dispute, which complicated efforts to memorialize Hard Scrabble. Richard Lobban, professor at Rhode Island College and the Naval War College, believed the riot took place on what is now the State House lawn while Ted Sanderson, executive director of the Rhode Island Historical Preservation and Heritage Commission said his research showed that the Hard Scrabble neighborhood was located around the base of Olney Street. In 2006, a memorial plaque was installed in a grass-covered traffic island at the corner of North Main and Canal Streets near the State House. A memorial for the Snow Town riot is located nearby at the Roger Williams National Memorial.

See also

History of Providence, Rhode Island

References

Further reading

External links

African-American history of Rhode Island
Ethnic enclaves in Rhode Island
History of Providence, Rhode Island
Populated places established by African Americans
Racially motivated violence against African Americans
Riots and civil disorder in Rhode Island
White American riots in the United States